The 1st FINA World Open Water Swimming Championships were held on October 29-November 4, 2000 in the waters off Waikiki Beach in Honolulu, Hawaii, USA. 164 swimmers from 34 countries swam in the championships, in race distances of 5-kilometer (5K), 10-kilometer (10K) and 25-kilometer (25K).

Results

Team medals

See also
2002 FINA World Open Water Swimming Championships

References

FINA World Open Water Swimming Championships
Fina World Open Water Swimming Championships, 2000
Fina World Open Water Swimming Championships, 2000
Rain Hawaii
Swimming competitions in the United States
International aquatics competitions hosted by the United States
Sports competitions in Hawaii
Swimming in Hawaii